Uhryniv is a village in Ivano-Frankivsk Raion, Ivano-Frankivsk Oblast. The village is located just outside the Ivano-Frankivsk city municipality to its north-west. The village is part of its own rural commune, the Uhryniv village council (silrada). It hosts the administration of Uhryniv rural hromada, one of the hromadas of Ukraine. There are over 3,000 residents.

Until 18 July 2020, Uhryniv belonged to Tysmenytsia Raion. The raion was abolished in July 2020 as part of the administrative reform of Ukraine, which reduced the number of raions of Ivano-Frankivsk Oblast to six. The area of Tysmenytsia Raion was merged into Ivano-Frankivsk Raion.

The village is located at the intersection of the Halych highway and Kalush highway. Some commuter trains also stop at the railway station.

The village is first mentioned in the 13th century.

Two rivers flow through Uhryniv: the Potik brook and the Bystrytsia river.

References

Villages in Ivano-Frankivsk Raion